Citti is a surname. 

Notable people with the surname include:

People
Christine Citti (born 1962), French actress
Franco Citti (1935–2016), Italian actor
Sergio Citti (1933–2005), Italian film director and screenwriter

Fictional characters
Sandra Citti, a character from the 1963 Soviet Russian-language science fiction novel Razor's Edge by Ivan Yefremov

See also

 Citi (disambiguation)
 Chiti (disambiguation)
 Chitti (disambiguation)
 Chithi (disambiguation)